Varmazyar or Varmaziar may refer to:
 Arevashat, Armenia
 Varmazyar, Iran (disambiguation)